The Tizard Bank,  is a partially sunken atoll and one of the significant maritime features of the north-western part of the Spratly Islands. It is claimed by the People's Republic of China, the Republic of China, and Vietnam, and various parts of it are occupied by these states.

It was named after Thomas Henry Tizard (1839 – 17 February 1924), a British oceanographer and surveyor who surveyed the bank from aboard HMS Rifleman in the 1860s. In 1947 the Republic of China government gave the bank the name Zheng He Archipelago after the famous Ming-era admiral, although there is no evidence that he ever visited Tizard Bank.

From before the 1870s the islands were used by fishermen from Hainan with Itu Aba Island having a semi-permanent settlement of Chinese fishermen.

The bank rises steeply from surrounding depths ranging from 500 to 700 meters. The central lagoon generally is 10 to 40 meters deep, although many coral heads have much shallower depths. There are several entrances into the lagoon.

The bank contains a number of features along the rim of the reef, including shoals, reefs, islands, and cays, numerous wrecks, some lighthouses, and an ammunition dumping ground in about 2000m of water to the north of Itu Aba. Several coral heads with depths of 6-12m lie in the lagoon, and depths "3.7m less than charted can be expected. ... Mariners should navigate with extreme caution in this vicinity."

Features in the area include:
Namyit Island (10°11'N 114°22'E) on the S side of the bank is about 12 miles S of Itu Aba. It is less than a metre high and covered with small trees and brush. Occupied by Vietnam.
Gaven Reefs (10°12'N 114°13'E) consists of two reefs which cover at high tide and lie 7 miles W and 8.5 miles WNW of Namyit Island. Occupied by China.
Itu Aba Island (10°23'N 114°22'E), lies on the NW edge of the bank. Occupied by Taiwan.
Zhongzhou Reef (Ban Than Reef / Centre Cay) lies on the north edge between Itu Aba and Sand Cay, 3 miles E of Itu Aba 
Sand Cay lies on the north edge, 4.5 miles E of Zhongzhou  
Petley Reef, which dries 0.9m, is about 1 mile in extent and lies on the N side of the bank. Occupied by Vietnam.
Eldad Reef, 7 miles ESE of Petley Reef, is the easternmost drying reef of the group. The reef is 4.5 miles long with the middle section having a depth of about 1.2m, located at the NE end of the reef. Unoccupied.

 

(Eldad Reef)

It is neighboured by the Loaita Bank to the North, Discovery Great Reef to the west, and the Union Banks to the south.

References

External links
 Chart of Tizard Bank

 
Banks of the Spratly Islands